Ljajić is a surname most prevalent among Bosniaks in Serbia. Notable people with the surname include:

Adem Ljajić (born 1991), Serbian footballer
Rasim Ljajić (born 1964), Serbian politician

Serbian surnames